Abbondanza is an Italian surname. Notable people with the surname include:

 Alessandro Abbondanza (born 1949), Italian football player and manager
 Marcello Abbondanza (born 1970), Italian volleyball coach

See also
 Andréanne Abbondanza-Bergeron, Canadian contemporary artist
 Colonna dell'Abbondanza, Florence, monumental column

Italian-language surnames